Wat Tham Khao Wong (วัดถ้ำเขาวง) is a Buddhist temple in tambon Ban Rai of the Ban Rai District of the province of Uthai Thani, Thailand, near the border with Suphan Buri Province. Built in 1987, it has a two-storey Thai-style convocation hall, and the area has been exquisitely landscaped.

References

Buddhist temples in Uthai Thani Province
Religious buildings and structures completed in 1987